Viktor Ivanovich Derbunov (born January 7, 1967) is a retired Russian professional football goalkeeper.

During his career he played with FC Dynamo Moscow, FC Krasnaya Presnya Moscow and FC Spartak Moscow in the Soviet League, FK Lokomotiva Mostar in Yugoslavia, FC Veres Rivne in Ukraine, F.C. Atlas in Mexico, Russian FC Rossiya Moscow and Happy Valley, Hong Kong Rangers FC and Golden in Hong-Kong.

External links
 Career in Yugoslavia at Tempo (Serbia magazine) #1338, pgs. 2-3

1967 births
Living people
Footballers from Moscow
Soviet footballers
Russian footballers
Russian expatriate footballers
Soviet expatriate footballers
Expatriate footballers in Ukraine
Expatriate footballers in Yugoslavia
Expatriate footballers in Mexico
Expatriate footballers in Hong Kong
FC Dynamo Moscow players
Soviet Top League players
FC Asmaral Moscow players
NK Veres Rivne players
Atlas F.C. footballers
Happy Valley AA players
Hong Kong Rangers FC players
Sun Hei SC players
Association football goalkeepers
Soviet expatriate sportspeople in Yugoslavia
Russian expatriate sportspeople in Ukraine
Russian expatriate sportspeople in Mexico
Russian expatriate sportspeople in Hong Kong
Liga MX players
FC Spartak Moscow players
Hong Kong League XI representative players